La Huerta  is a town and municipality, in Jalisco in central-western Mexico. The municipality covers an area of 1,749.71 km².

As of 2005, the municipality had a total population of 20,161.

Its inhabitants, before the arrival of the Spaniards, were from Mazatlan. The first settlement of this town was on the hill that is west of what is now La Huerta, within a palm of coquito oil and next to an eye of water.

Tourism

Its inhabitants, before the arrival of the Spaniards, were from Mazatlan. The first settlement of this town was on the hill that is west of what is now La Huerta, within a palm of coquito oil and next to an eye of water.

Tourist and Cultural Attractions

Historical Monuments 
Bust dedicated to Don Miguel Hidalgo y Costilla, is located in the main garden.
Parties:
In the month of February the Holy Family is celebrated, the celebrations can be held any Sunday of the month. The Bullfighting Fair is celebrated from December 13 to 27.

Music 
Mariachi.

Crafts 
The products of engraved shell, typical otate furniture, gun handles, textiles and embroidery stand out.

Gastronomy
Saucers made of shrimp, octopus, fish and jackal; cocadas, sweet potato or orange and drunk; The fruit waters of the region are traditional.

References

Municipalities of Jalisco